Mitzpe Ramon Airfield  is an Israeli airfield  in the north of the town of Mitzpe Ramon.

Airports in Israel